Mark Aarons (born 25 December 1951) is an Australian journalist and author. He was a political adviser to New South Wales Premier Bob Carr.

Biography 
Aarons was born in Newcastle, New South Wales, but he was brought up in Sydney. He was educated at Fairfield Boys High School and North Sydney Boys High School. He is the son of the late Laurie Aarons, former secretary of the Communist Party of Australia. Aarons was also a member of the Communist Party of Australia from 1969 to 1978, and a Young Communist organiser in 1977.

Aarons' activism started at North Sydney Boys High School in the mid-1960s, especially in organising students to protest the Vietnam War. His 1986 ABC radio documentary series Nazis in Australia prompted the Bob Hawke government's inquiry into war criminals and formation of Special Investigations Unit.

Aarons contends that right-wing authoritarian regimes and dictatorships backed by Western powers committed atrocities and mass killings that rival the Communist world, citing examples such as the Indonesian mass killings of 1965–66 and the killings associated with Operation Condor throughout South America.

Bibliography 

 
 
 East Timor: A Western Made Tragedy, Sydney: Left Book Club, 1992.
 The Secret War Against the Jews: How Western Espionage Betrayed the Jewish People, with John Loftus, St. Martin's Press, 1994, 
 War Criminals Welcome: Australia, a Sanctuary for War Criminals Since 1945, Melbourne: Black Inc., 2001
 
 The Family File, Melbourne: Black Inc., 2010.
 
 
 The Show: Another Side of Santamaria's Movement (co-authored with John Grenville), Melbourne: Scribe Publications, 2017.

References

External links 
 Dynasties, a program on Aarons and his family's history broadcast in January 2006

1951 births
Australian people of German-Jewish descent
Jewish Australian writers
Journalists from New South Wales
Living people
People educated at North Sydney Boys High School
People from Newcastle, New South Wales